Lee Su-hyong (born May 14, 1986) is a South Korean football player previously play for PSPS Pekanbaru in Indonesia Super League.

References

External links
SU HYONG LEE at Liga Indonesia

1986 births
Living people
South Korean footballers
South Korean expatriate footballers
South Korean expatriate sportspeople in Indonesia
Expatriate footballers in Indonesia
Liga 1 (Indonesia) players
PSPS Pekanbaru players
Association football midfielders